The 2024 ICC Women's T20 World Cup is scheduled to be the ninth edition of ICC Women's T20 World Cup tournament. It is scheduled to be hosted in Bangladesh between September to October 2024. Australia are the defending champions.

Teams and qualification 
In July 2022 the ICC confirmed the qualification process for the tournament. Bangladesh qualified for the tournament automatically as the hosts.

References

External links

 
T20 World Cup
International women's cricket competitions in Bangladesh
ICC Women's T20 World Cup 2024